Ataksak is a goddess in Inuit mythology. She is the ruler of the sky, and represents the light in the world that brings joy and happiness to the people.

Inuit mythology
Inuit goddesses
Sky and weather goddesses